John Newlove (birth registered fourth ¼ 1944) is an English former professional rugby league footballer who played in the 1960s, 1970s and 1980s.

Background
John Newlove's birth was registered in Pontefract district, West Riding of Yorkshire, England.

Playing career

Championship appearances
John Newlove played in the Featherstone Rovers' victory in Championship during the 1976–77 season, although he sustained an injury which kept him out during the run-in to the title.

Challenge Cup Final appearances

County Cup Final appearances
John Newlove played , i.e. number 2, in the Featherstone Rovers' 9–12 defeat by Hull F.C. in the 1969–70 Yorkshire County Cup Final during the 1969–70 season at Headingley Rugby Stadium, Leeds on Saturday 20 September 1969, played left-, i.e. number 4, in the 7–23 defeat by Leeds in the 1970–71 Yorkshire County Cup Final during the 1970–71 season at Odsal Stadium, Bradford on Saturday 21 November 1970, played  in the 12–16 defeat by Leeds in the 1976–77 Yorkshire County Cup Final during the 1976–77 season at Headingley Rugby Stadium, Leeds on Saturday 16 October 1976, and played  in the 7–17 defeat by Castleford in the 1977–78 Yorkshire County Cup Final during the 1977–78 season at Headingley Rugby Stadium, Leeds on Saturday 15 October 1977.

BBC2 Floodlit Trophy Final appearances
John Newlove played  in Hull FC's 13–3 victory over the Hull Kingston Rovers in the 1979 BBC2 Floodlit Trophy Final during the 1979-80 season at The Boulevard, Kingston upon Hull on Tuesday 18 December 1979.

Club career
John Newlove made his début for Featherstone Rovers on Saturday 19 November 1966.

Testimonial match
John Newlove's benefit season/testimonial match at the Featherstone Rovers took place during the 1977–78 season.

Honoured at Featherstone Rovers
John Newlove is a Featherstone Rovers Hall of Fame inductee.

Genealogical information
John Newlove's marriage to Margaret (née Stone, and sister of the rugby league footballer; Richard 'Charlie' Stone) was registered during second ¼ 1970 in Pontefract district. They had children; the future rugby league footballer who played in the 1980s and 1990s for the Featherstone Rovers (Heritage No. 673); Shaun Newlove (birth registered during third ¼  in Pontefract district), the future rugby league footballer; Paul Newlove, and the future rugby league footballer Richard Newlove.

References

External links
John Newlove
John Newlove, Shaun Newlove, Paul Newlove and Richard Newlove

1942 births
Living people
English rugby league players
Featherstone Rovers captains
Featherstone Rovers players
Hull F.C. players
Rugby league centres
Rugby league five-eighths
Rugby league players from Pontefract
Rugby league wingers